The third competition weekend of the 2012–13 ISU Speed Skating World Cup was held in the Alau Ice Palace in Astana, Kazakhstan, from Saturday, 1 December, until Sunday, 2 December 2012.

Schedule of events
Schedule of the event:

Medal summary

Men's events

Women's events

References

3
Isu World Cup, 2012-13, 3
Sport in Astana